Nectandra barbellata is a species of plant in the family Lauraceae. It is endemic to Brazil.  It is threatened by habitat loss.

References

barbellata
Endemic flora of Brazil
Flora of the Atlantic Forest
Flora of Espírito Santo
Flora of São Paulo (state)
Vulnerable flora of South America
Taxonomy articles created by Polbot